Dolgovsky is a rural locality (a khutor) in Akchernskoye Rural Settlement, Uryupinsky District, Volgograd Oblast, Russia. The population was 274 as of 2010. There are 9 streets.

Geography 
Dolgovsky is located in steppe, 22 km southwest of Uryupinsk (the district's administrative centre) by road. Dyakonovsky 1-y is the nearest rural locality.

References 

Rural localities in Uryupinsky District